The Wrestling is a non-fiction book by Simon Garfield, a British journalist and author. It charts the rise and fall in popularity of British professional wrestling over the course of the twentieth century.

Overview 
The book consists almost entirely of interviews with professional wrestlers or those who knew them, including Mick McManus, Big Daddy, Giant Haystacks, Kendo Nagasaki and the female wrestler Klondyke Kate, often giving the appearance of a conversation between the interviewees and the author.

Garfield also interviewed those involved in the promotion of professional wrestling, with a particular focus on the decision of LWT chief Greg Dyke to drop the sport from its schedules in 1988.

References

1996 non-fiction books
Professional wrestling books
Faber and Faber books
Books of interviews